Where Legend Began  is probably English Dogs' most successful album and also their album most heavily influenced by thrash metal. It was released on the Under One Flag label late in 1986. A re-release ties "Trauma" and "The Eye of Shamahn" together as one song.

LP track listing
All songs written by English Dogs (Adie, Gizz Butt, Wattie, Pinch), except where noted.

Side one
 "Trauma" - 1:54	
 "The Eye of Shamahn" (English Dogs, Jon Murray) - 5:01	
 "Enter the Domain" - 5:01	
 "Premonition" - 5:58	
 "Calm Before the Storm" - 5:05

Side two
 "Flashback" - 4:11	
 "A Tomb of Travellers Past" - 5:08	
 "Middle Earth" - 5:07	
 "Epilogue" - 8:08

Personnel
Ade "Adie" Bailey: Lead Vocal
Gizz Butt: Lead & Rhythm Guitar, Backing Vocal
Mark "Wattie" Watson: Bass, Backing Vocal
Andrew "Pinch" Pinching: Drums, Percussion, Backing Vocal

Production
Arranged By English Dogs
Produced By English Dogs & Pete Gill
Recorded, Engineered & Mixed By Jules Baby & Pete Gill
Assistant Engineers: Danthrax Smith

Design
The album cover design is by the artist Duncan "Celt" Storr.

References

External links
"Where Legend Began" at discogs

1987 albums
English Dogs albums
Music for Nations albums